Jens Jørn Spottag (born 13 December 1957) is a Danish actor. He appeared in more than seventy films since 1987.

Selected filmography

References

External links 

1957 births
Living people
Danish male film actors